The Predynastic Zhou or Proto-Zhou refers to the state of Zhou that existed in the Guanzhong region of modern Shaanxi province during the Shang dynasty of ancient China, before its conquest of the Shang in 1046/1045 BC which led to the establishment of the Zhou dynasty. It was ruled by the Ji clan.

History
According to Sima Qian, it was established by Gugong Danfu when he relocated his clan from their home of Bin to a new settlement along the Wei River. His two elder sons Taibo and Zhongyong were said to have abandoned the territory and fled south to establish Wu on the lower Yangtze. His youngest son Jili then inherited Zhou and expanded it with numerous campaigns against the Rong "barbarians" around Shang. His power threatened King Wen Ding and he was tricked into an ambush at a place called Saiku. Jili's son King Wen was likewise imprisoned by King Zhou of Shang at Youli before being ransomed by other nobles. In some accounts, Wen was forced to consume his eldest son as meat cakes or a soup at the king's bequest. His second son then avenged his grandfather and brother at the Battle of Muye, defeating King Zhou and ending the Shang.

Rulers

 Gong Liu, who led the migration of the clan to Bin 
 Gugong Danfu, also known as King Tai of Zhou
 Jili, also known as King Ji of Zhou
 King Wen of Zhou
 King Wu of Zhou, who conquered Shang and established the Zhou dynasty

See also
 Kings of Zhou
 Ancestry of the Zhou dynasty

References 

Shang dynasty
Zhou dynasty